The e-Go Aeroplanes e-Go, originally known as the E-Plane,  is a British ultralight and light-sport aircraft that was designed by Giotto Castelli, that was being developed by e-Go Aeroplanes of Cambridge and since May 2017, by GioCAS Aeronautical Consultancy, also located in Cambridge.

The aircraft won the Light Aircraft Association's design competition in 2007. It was first flown on 24 October 2013, with the first public flight-test and demonstration on 30 October 2013. The aircraft was initially to be supplied as a complete ready-to-fly-aircraft.

Production plans for the design were suspended and staff laid off in November 2016 as e-Go Aeroplanes was unable to raise capital in the wake of the British Brexit vote. The aircraft program was acquired by the designer, Castelli, in May 2017, with the aim of bringing it to production.

Design and development
The aircraft was designed to comply with the United Kingdom single-seat deregulated microlight class, as well as to comply with the Fédération Aéronautique Internationale microlight rules. The aircraft cruise speed is planned to be modified for US light-sport aircraft rules. It features a cantilever mid wing, a canard foreplane, a single-seat enclosed cockpit, fixed tricycle landing gear and a pusher engine and propeller. This follows the configuration established by the Rutan VariViggen and VariEze. The single engine is a Rotron Wankel engine based on Rotron's RT300 LCR engine which is intended for drones.

The aircraft is made from a combination of carbon fibre and foam.

During 2016, e-Go Aeroplanes announced that full production would not proceed without further financial input, "an investment memorandum for a third round of funding was issued and distributed in July this year ... shareholder interest generated was insufficient, coupled with the unsure financial market following Brexit. The Board made the very difficult decision to make all staff positions redundant."

In November 2016, e-Go Aeroplanes's operation was mothballed, and "overseen by Chief Operating Officer, Richard Clabon and the General Manager David Boughey". The company website stated that it was still looking for a buyer. but the company went into administration in the spring of 2017.

In May 2017 the assets of e-Go Aeroplanes were acquired by the aircraft's designer, Giotto Castelli, indicating that he would pursue production under his company, GioCAS Aeronautical Consultancy.

Specifications (e-Go)

References

External links

Previous official website
Official first flight video

2010s British ultralight aircraft
Homebuilt aircraft
Light-sport aircraft
Single-engined pusher aircraft
Wankel-engined aircraft
Canard aircraft
Aircraft first flown in 2013